Stegnaster inflatus is a sea star of the family Asterinidae, endemic to New Zealand.

References
 Miller M & Batt G, Reef and Beach Life of New Zealand, William Collins (New Zealand) Ltd, Auckland, New Zealand 1973
 NIWA
 SeaFriends

External links 
 

Asterinidae
Echinoderms of New Zealand
Taxa named by Frederick Hutton (scientist)
Animals described in 1872